Dean Anderson (born 1 August 1967) is a former Australian rules footballer who played for Hawthorn and St Kilda in the Australian Football League. Dean is now the Chief Executive Officer at Leading Teams.

Personal life
Anderson's son, Noah, was drafted by the Gold Coast Suns with the second pick in the 2019 AFL draft.

Hawthorn
A footballer who could run all day, Anderson was recruited from Caulfield Grammar He played as a 
half forward and kicked four goals in Hawthorn's 1989 Grand Final triumph. He was also one of the better players in the 1991 Grand Final win.

St Kilda
Anderson crossed to St Kilda in 1993 where he played another 67 games before retiring.

See also
 List of Caulfield Grammar School people

References

External links

Profile at Hawksheadquarters
Dean Anderson's profile on the Leading Teams website

Australian rules footballers from Victoria (Australia)
1967 births
Living people
Hawthorn Football Club players
Hawthorn Football Club Premiership players
St Kilda Football Club players
Victorian State of Origin players
People educated at Caulfield Grammar School
Caulfield Grammarians Football Club players
Australia international rules football team players
St Kilda Football Club administrators
Two-time VFL/AFL Premiership players